Perseverance of the saints (also called preservation of the saints) is a Christian teaching that asserts that once a person is truly "born of God" or "regenerated" by the indwelling of the Holy Spirit, they will continue doing good works and believing in God until the end of their life.

Sometimes this position is held in conjunction with Reformed Christian confessions of faith in traditional Calvinist doctrine, which argues that all men are "dead in trespasses and sins", and so apart from being resurrected from spiritual death to spiritual life, no-one chooses salvation alone. However, it must be distinguished from Arminianism, which also teaches that all men are "dead in trespasses and sins", and could not respond to the gospel if God did not enable individuals to do so by His prevenient grace.

Calvinists maintain that God selected certain individuals for salvation, before the world began, and that he subsequently irresistably draws only these selected individuals to faith in him and his son, Jesus. In support of this, they interpret  as a statement that only those pre-ordained for belief in god are drawn to him, with an irresistable grace, as opposed to the Arminian interpretation that all are drawn to him by his prevenient grace, which individuals may resist.

The doctrine of Perseverance of the Saints is distinct from the doctrine of Assurance, which describes how a person may first be sure that they have obtained salvation and an inheritance in the promises of the Bible including eternal life. The Westminster Confession of Faith covers Perseverance of the Saints in chapter 17, and Assurance of Grace and Salvation in chapter 18. Perseverance of the Saints is also distinct from the related doctrine of eternal security, the former indicating security of sanctification/condition while the latter indicates security of (forensic) justification/salvation.

History

Church Father Augustine of Hippo taught that some of those whom God chooses to save by regeneration through water baptism are given, in addition to the gift of faith, a gift of perseverance which enables them to continue to believe, and precludes the possibility of falling away. Perseverance of the saints also predates Calvin in the teachings of Jovinian.

The traditional Calvinist doctrine is one of the five points of Calvinism that were defined at the Synod of Dort during the Quinquarticular Controversy with the Arminian Remonstrants, who objected to the general predestinarian scheme of Calvinism. Arminianism teaches that salvation is conditioned on faith, therefore perseverance of the saints is also conditioned.

The traditional Calvinist doctrine of perseverance is articulated in the Canons of Dort (chapter 5), the Westminster Confession of Faith (chapter XVII), the 1689 Baptist Confession of Faith (chapter 17), and may also be found in other Reformed Confessions. Nonetheless, the doctrine is most often mentioned in connection with other salvific schemes and is not a major focus of Reformed systematic theology. It is, however, seen by many as the necessary consequence of Calvinism and of trusting in the promises of God.

Reformed doctrine

The Reformed tradition has consistently seen the doctrine of perseverance as a natural consequence to predestination. According to Calvinists, since God has drawn the elect to faith in Christ by regenerating their hearts and convincing them of their sins, and thus saving their souls by his own work and power, it naturally follows that they will be kept by the same power to the end. Since God has made satisfaction for the sins of the elect, they can no longer be condemned for them, and through the help of the Holy Spirit, they must necessarily persevere as Christians and in the end be saved. Calvinists believe this is what Peter is teaching in  when he says that true believers are "kept by the power of God through faith unto salvation." Outside Calvinist denominations, this doctrine is widely considered to be flawed.

Calvinists also believe that all who are born again and justified before God necessarily and inexorably proceed to sanctification. Failure to proceed to sanctification in their view is considered by some as evidence that the person in question was never truly saved to begin with. Proponents of this doctrine distinguish between an action and the consequences of an action, and suggest that after God has regenerated someone, the person's will has been changed, that "old things pass away" and "all things are become new," as it is written in 2 Corinthians 5:17, and he or she will as a consequence persevere in the faith.

The Westminster Confession of Faith defined perseverance as follows:

This definition does not deny the possibility of failings in one's Christian experience, because the Confession also says:

Theologian Charles Hodge summarizes the thrust of the Calvinist doctrine:

On a practical level, Calvinists do not claim to know who is elect and who is not, and the only guide they have is the verbal testimony and good works (or "fruit") of each individual. Any who "fall away" are assumed not to have been truly converted to begin with, though Calvinists do not claim to know with certainty who did and who did not persevere.

Essentially, Reformed doctrine believes that the same God whose power justified the Christian believer is also at work in the continued sanctification of that believer. As  says, "It is God who is at work in you, both to will and work for His good pleasure"; thus, all who are truly born again are kept by God the Father for Jesus Christ, and can neither totally nor finally fall from the state of grace, but will persevere in their faith to the end, and be eternally saved. While Reformed theologians acknowledge that true believers at times will fall into sin, they maintain that a real believer in Jesus Christ cannot abandon one's own personal faith to the dominion of sin, basing their understanding on key scriptural passages such as Christ's words, "By their fruit you will know them" and "He that endures to the end will be saved." Similarly, a passage in 1 John says, "This is how we know who the children of God are and who the children of the devil are: Anyone who does not do what is right is not a child of God." The person who has truly been made righteous in Jesus Christ did not simply have faith at some point in life, but continues to live in that faith. This view understands that the security of believers is inseparable from their perseverance in the faith.

Free Grace doctrine
The Free Grace or non-traditional Calvinist doctrine has been espoused by Charles Stanley, Norman Geisler, Zane C. Hodges, Bill Bright, and others. This view, like the traditional Calvinist view, emphasizes that people are saved purely by an act of divine grace that does not depend at all on the deeds of the individual, and for that reason (in contrary to Calvinism) insists that nothing the person can do can affect their salvation. In the Free Grace view, saints can fall away (stop persevering) in both conduct and faith yet remain eternally secure.

Evangelical criticism
Both traditional Calvinism and traditional Arminianism reject Free Grace theology. The former believes Free Grace to be a distorted form of Calvinism which maintains the permanency of salvation (or properly speaking, justification) while radically divorcing the ongoing work of sanctification from that justification. Reformed theology has uniformly asserted that "no man is a Christian who does not feel some special love for righteousness" (Institutes), and therefore sees Free Grace theology, which allows for the concept of a "carnal Christian" or even an "unbelieving Christian", as a form of radical antinomianism. Arminianism, which has always believed true believers can give themselves completely over to sin, has also rejected the Free Grace view for the opposite reason of Calvinism: namely, that the view denies the classical Arminian doctrine that true Christians can lose their salvation by denouncing their faith.

Free Grace theology maintains the middle ground of the permanency of salvation seen in Calvinism with the maintained belief that a believer can still give up their faith, choosing to live a life of unbelief. If we disown him, he will also disown us").

Biblical evidence

In addition to fitting neatly in the overarching Calvinist soteriology, Reformed and Free Grace advocates alike find specific support for the doctrine in various passages from the Bible:

 : "Being born again, not of corruptible seed, but of incorruptible, by the word of God, which liveth and abideth for ever."
 : "Truly, truly, I say to you, whoever hears my word and believes him who sent me has eternal life. He does not come into judgment, but has passed from death to life."
 : Jesus said to them, "I am the bread of life; whoever comes to me shall not hunger, and whoever believes in me shall never thirst. But I said to you that you have seen me and yet do not believe. All that the Father gives me will come to me, and whoever comes to me I will never cast out."
 : "My sheep hear my voice, and I know them, and they follow me. I give them eternal life, and they will never perish, and no one will snatch them out of my hand. My Father, who has given them to me, is greater than all, and no one is able to snatch them out of the Father’s hand."
 : Since, therefore, we have now been justified by his blood, much more shall we be saved by him from the wrath of God.
 : There is therefore now no condemnation for those who are in Christ Jesus.
 : Who shall separate us from the love of Christ? Shall tribulation, or distress, or persecution, or famine, or nakedness, or danger, or sword?
 : For I am sure that neither death nor life, nor angels nor rulers, nor things present nor things to come, nor powers, nor height nor depth, nor anything else in all creation, will be able to separate us from the love of God in Christ Jesus our Lord.
 : For the gifts and the calling of God are irrevocable.
 : For we have come to share in Christ, if indeed we hold our original confidence firm to the end.
 : They went out from us, but they were not of us; for if they had been of us, they would have continued with us. But they went out, that it might become plain that they all are not of us.
 : But by the grace of God I am what I am, and his grace toward me was not in vain. On the contrary, I worked harder than any of them, though it was not I, but the grace of God that is with me.
 : ...that is, in Christ God was reconciling the world to himself, not counting their trespasses against them, and entrusting to us the message of reconciliation.
 : But God, being rich in mercy, because of the great love with which he loved us, even when we were dead in our trespasses, made us alive together with Christ — by grace you have been saved — and raised us up with him and seated us with him in the heavenly places in Christ Jesus...
 : And do not grieve the Holy Spirit of God, by whom you were sealed for the day of redemption.
 : And I am sure of this, that he who began a good work in you will bring it to completion at the day of Jesus Christ.
 : ...which is why I suffer as I do. But I am not ashamed, for I know whom I have believed, and I am convinced that he is able to guard until that Day what has been entrusted to me.
 : ...if we are faithless, he remains faithful — for he cannot deny himself.
 : Now may the God of peace who brought again from the dead our Lord Jesus, the great shepherd of the sheep, by the blood of the eternal covenant, equip you with everything good that you may do his will, working in us that which is pleasing in his sight, through Jesus Christ, to whom be glory forever and ever. Amen.
 : No one born of God makes a practice of sinning, for God’s seed abides in him, and he cannot keep on sinning because he has been born of God.
 : For everyone who has been born of God overcomes the world. And this is the victory that has overcome the world — our faith. Who is it that overcomes the world except the one who believes that Jesus is the Son of God?
 : In him you also, when you heard the word of truth, the gospel of your salvation, and believed in him, were sealed with the promised Holy Spirit, who is the guarantee of our inheritance until we acquire possession of it, to the praise of his glory.
 : "...since you have given him authority over all flesh, to give eternal life to all whom you have given him." (12) "While I was with them, I kept them in your name, which you have given me. I have guarded them, and not one of them has been lost except the son of destruction, that the Scripture might be fulfilled."
 : ...even as the testimony about Christ was confirmed among you — so that you are not lacking in any spiritual gift, as you wait for the revealing of our Lord Jesus Christ, who will sustain you to the end, guiltless in the day of our Lord Jesus Christ.
 : Now may the God of peace himself sanctify you completely, and may your whole spirit and soul and body be kept blameless at the coming of our Lord Jesus Christ. He who calls you is faithful; he will surely do it.
 : But the Lord is faithful. He will establish you and guard you against the evil one.
 : ...he entered once for all into the holy places, not by means of the blood of goats and calves but by means of his own blood, thus securing an eternal redemption.
 : Blessed be the God and Father of our Lord Jesus Christ! According to his great mercy, he has caused us to be born again to a living hope through the resurrection of Jesus Christ from the dead, to an inheritance that is imperishable, undefiled, and unfading, kept in heaven for you, who by God’s power are being guarded through faith for a salvation ready to be revealed in the last time.
 : And this is the testimony, that God gave us eternal life, and this life is in his Son. Whoever has the Son has life; whoever does not have the Son of God does not have life. I write these things to you who believe in the name of the Son of God that you may know that you have eternal life.
 : So when God desired to show more convincingly to the heirs of the promise the unchangeable character of his purpose, he guaranteed it with an oath, so that by two unchangeable things, in which it is impossible for God to lie, we who have fled for refuge might have strong encouragement to hold fast to the hope set before us. We have this as a sure and steadfast anchor of the soul, a hope that enters into the inner place behind the curtain...
 : I will give them one heart and one way, that they may fear me forever, for their own good and the good of their children after them. I will make with them an everlasting covenant, that I will not turn away from doing good to them. And I will put the fear of me in their hearts, that they may not turn from me.
 
 : Listen to me, O house of Jacob, all the remnant of the house of Israel, who have been borne by me from before your birth, carried from the womb; even to your old age I am he, and to gray hairs I will carry you. I have made, and I will bear; I will carry and will save.
 : But it is not as though the word of God has failed. For not all who are descended from Israel belong to Israel, and not all are children of Abraham because they are his offspring, but "Through Isaac shall your offspring be named." This means that it is not the children of the flesh who are the children of God, but the children of the promise are counted as offspring.
 : Now I know that the LORD saves his anointed; he will answer him from his holy heaven with the saving might of his right hand.
 : Love the LORD, all you his saints! The LORD preserves the faithful but abundantly repays the one who acts in pride.
 : For the LORD loves justice; he will not forsake his saints. They are preserved forever, but the children of the wicked shall be cut off.
 : Cast your burden on the LORD, and he will sustain you; he will never permit the righteous to be moved.
 : They that trust in the Lord shall be as mount Zion, which cannot be removed, but abideth for ever. As the mountains are round about Jerusalem, so the Lord is round about his people from henceforth even for ever.

Counter evidence

Calvinist interpretations
Some Calvinists admit that their interpretation is not without difficulties. One apparent consequence is that not all who "have shared in the Holy Spirit" are necessarily regenerate. This is a consequence Calvinists are willing to accept since the Bible also says that King Saul had the "Spirit of God" in some sense and even prophesied by it,  but was not a follower of God. Calvin says,

 God indeed favors none but the elect alone with the Spirit of regeneration, and that by this they are distinguished from the reprobate… But I cannot admit that all this is any reason why he should not grant the reprobate also some taste of his grace, why he should not irradiate their minds with some sparks of his light, why he should not give them some perception of his goodness, and in some sort engrave his word on their hearts.

The former passage says of those "who have once been enlightened, who have tasted the heavenly gift, and have shared in the Holy Spirit, and have tasted the goodness of the word of God and the powers of the age to come" that, when they "fall away", they cannot be "restored to repentance." The latter passage says that if one continues in sin, "no sacrifice for sins" remains for that person but "only a fearful expectation of judgment." The author of Hebrews predicts grave punishment for one who "has trampled the Son of God under foot, who has treated as an unholy thing the blood of the covenant that sanctified him, and who has insulted the Spirit of grace."

The debate over these passages centers around the identity of the persons in question. While opponents of perseverance identify the persons as Christian believers, Calvinists suggest several other options:

 These passages are not clear enough to describe a regenerate person (or "true Christian"), and thus they do not describe the situation of a true believer. In an effort to corroborate this interpretation, they also cite such passages as : "They went out from us, but they were not of us; for if they had been of us, they would have continued with us. But they went out, that it might become plain that they all are not of us." However, this interpretation also has difficulty with verse 6 which states that it is impossible "if they shall fall away, to renew them again unto repentance."
 These passages can refer to a regenerate person, but what is described is not a loss of salvation (because they believe other scriptural passages say that this is impossible), but instead a loss of eternal (or millennial) rewards.
 The passages refer to Jewish Christians who were reverting to Judaism.
 The passages refer to the rejection of the covenant community as a whole, not individual believers (Verbrugge).

Passages put forth against the Calvinist doctrine 
Some other passages put forth against the Calvinist doctrine include:
 : Note then the kindness and the severity of God: severity toward those who have fallen, but God’s kindness to you, provided you continue in his kindness. Otherwise you too will be cut off.
 : Every athlete exercises self-control in all things. They do it to receive a perishable wreath, but we an imperishable. So I do not run aimlessly; I do not box as one beating the air. But I discipline my body and keep it under control, lest after preaching to others I myself should be disqualified.
 :Therefore, whoever thinks he is standing secure should take care not to fall.
 : You are severed from Christ, you who would be justified by the law; you have fallen away from grace.
 : For if, after they have escaped the defilements of the world through the knowledge of our Lord and Savior Jesus Christ, they are again entangled in them and overcome, the last state has become worse for them than the first.
 : And you, who once were alienated and hostile in mind, doing evil deeds, he has now reconciled in his body of flesh by his death, in order to present you holy and blameless and above reproach before him, if indeed you continue in the faith, stable and steadfast, not shifting from the hope of the gospel that you heard, which has been proclaimed in all creation under heaven, and of which I, Paul, became a minister.
:Take heed, brethren, lest there be in any of you an evil heart of unbelief, in departing from the living God. For we are made partakers of Christ, if we hold the beginning of our confidence stedfast unto the end.
 : "Wake up, and strengthen what remains and is about to die, for I have not found your works complete in the sight of my God. Remember, then, what you received and heard. Keep it, and repent. If you will not wake up, I will come like a thief, and you will not know at what hour I will come against you. Yet you have still a few names in Sardis, people who have not soiled their garments, and they will walk with me in white, for they are worthy. The one who conquers will be clothed thus in white garments, and I will never blot his name out of the book of life. I will confess his name before my Father and before his angels."

In general, proponents of the doctrine of perseverance interpret such passages, which urge the church community to persevere in the faith but seem to indicate that some members of the community might fall away, as encouragement to persevere rather than divine warnings. That is, they view the prophets and apostles as writing "from the human perspective", in which the members of the elect are unknowable and all should "work out [their] own salvation" and "make [their] calling and election sure," rather than "from the divine perspective", in which those who will persevere, according to Calvinism, are well known. The primary objection to this Calvinist approach is that it might equally be said that these difficult passages are intended to be divine warnings to believers who do not persevere, rather than a revealing of God's perpetual grace towards believers.

Interpretations of Hebrews 6:4–6
 is said by some to be one of the Bible's most difficult passages to interpret, and may present the most difficulty for proponents of the Eternal Security of the Believer. The passage is understood by some to mean that "falling away" from an active commitment to Christ may cause one to lose their salvation, after they have attained salvation either according to the Reformed or Free Grace theology. However, numerous conservative Bible scholars do not believe the passage refers to a Christian losing genuinely attained salvation.

 One interpretation holds that this passage is written not about Christians but about unbelievers who are convinced of the basic truths of the gospel but who have not placed their faith in Jesus Christ as Savior. They are intellectually persuaded but spiritually uncommitted. The phrase "once enlightened" may refer to some level of instruction in biblical truth. "…have tasted the good word of God and the powers of the age to come, and then have fallen away…" could be a reference to those who have tasted the truth about Jesus but, not having come all the way to faith, fall away from even the revelation they have been given. The tasting of truth is not enough to keep them from falling away from it. They must come all the way to Christ in complete repentance and faith.
 A second interpretation holds that this passage is written about Christians, and that the phrases "partakers of the Holy Ghost", "enlightened", and "tasted of the heavenly gift" are all descriptions of true believers. Others see them as severe warnings which do not include the loss of salvation, but in many cases fiery judgment for those who were never saved and only playing at Christianity.
A third interpretation maintains that Hebrews 6:4-8 describes only those who temporarily backslide in their faith, and does not address the issue of the loss of salvation. This interpretation is well presented in an exegetical outline of the book of Hebrews found on the website of Ariel Ministries, a Messianic-Jewish organization founded by Arnold Fruchtenbaum in 1971. Some advocates of this position claim that the passage says that those who experience the five spiritual privileges mentioned in verses 4 and 5 cannot lose their salvation and then be saved again later (i.e. be "restore[d]... again to repentance") because that would require a recrucifixion of Christ (v. 6), thus rendering ineffectual his initial propitiatory death, putting Him to open shame. This position maintains that the Greek word used for "repentance" in verse 6 refers to "salvation repentance" rather than "repentance to restore fellowship." Supporters of this interpretation also cite the overall context of chapters 5 and 6 as evidence for their position: chapter 5 concludes with a rebuke to the recipients of the epistle for wasting time, dawdling in spiritual infancy, while chapter 6 begins with an exhortation not to continue wasting time as spiritual infants, but to "press on to maturity."
 Biblical theologian David DeSilva writes that "Many interpreters are driven to treat this passage as either a 'problem passage' or crux for a specific theological or ideological conviction." DeSilva agrees that the passage cannot refer to "saved" individuals since the author of Hebrews views salvation as the deliverance and reward that awaits the faithful at the return of Christ. Those who have trusted God's promise and Jesus' mediation are "those who are about to inherit salvation' which comes at Christ's second coming. He argues that the passage refers to unbelievers who have received God's gifts and have benefited from God's grace, yet still remained skeptics.
 Biblical theologian B. J. Oropeza suggests that those who read and listened to this letter had experienced persecutions in the past, and the author of Hebrews acknowledges that some church members had become apostates. The several terms in Hebrews 6:1–6 are to stress that these former apostates had experienced conversion-initiation; there is no place in the New Testament, for example, where unbelievers or fake Christians explicitly share in the Holy Spirit as did these former members. The author of Hebrews thus rhetorically stresses that despite all these benefits and experiences that confirmed their conversion, they fell away; and now he warns the hearers of this message that in their present state of malaise and neglecting church gatherings, the same thing could happen to them. The consequences of apostasy without restoration are portrayed as dire.

Objections
The primary objection put against Perseverance of the Saints is that its teaching may lead believers to sin freely, if they know they can never lose their salvation, without fear of eternal consequences. Traditional Calvinists see this charge as being justly leveled against the Free Grace doctrine, which does not see sanctification as a necessary component of salvation, and in the controversy over Lordship salvation, traditional Calvinists argued against the proponents of the Free Grace doctrine. Traditional Calvinists, and many other non-Calvinist evangelicals, posit that a truly converted heart will necessarily follow after God and live in accordance with his precepts, though perfection is not achievable, struggles with sin will continue, and some temporary "backsliding" may occur.

Arminian view

The central tenet of the Arminian view is that although believers are preserved from all external forces that might attempt to separate them from God, they have the free will to separate themselves from God. Although God will not change his mind about a believer's salvation, a believer can willingly repudiate faith (either by express denial of faith or by continued sinful activity combined with an unwillingness to repent). In this manner, salvation is conditional, not unconditional as Calvinism teaches.

Traditional Calvinists do not dispute that salvation requires faithfulness. However, Calvinists contend that God is sovereign and cannot permit a true believer to depart from faith. Arminians argue that God is sufficiently sovereign and omnipotent to embed free will into humanity, so that true Christians may exercise free will and fall away from the saving grace they once possessed.

Roman Catholic view
The 22nd Canon of the Decree Concerning Justification of the Council of Trent (Sixth Session, 13 January 1547) has this to say regarding perseverance: "If anyone says that the one justified either can without the special help of God persevere in the justice received, or that with that help he cannot, let him be anathema." In this canon, the Council reaffirmed that perseverance absolutely requires divine help—a divine help that is fully sufficient.

Respecting these parameters, Catholics can have a variety of views as regards final perseverance. On questions of predestination, Catholic scholars may be broadly characterized as either Molinists or Thomists. The views of the latter are similar to those of Calvinists, in that they understand final perseverance to be a gift applied by God to the regenerated that will assuredly lead them to ultimate salvation. They differ from Calvinists in but one respect: whether God permits men to "fall away" after regeneration. Thomists affirm that God can permit men to come to regeneration without giving them the special gift of divine perseverance, so that they do fall away. Calvinists, by contrast, deny that an individual can fall away if they are truly regenerate.

Lutheran view
Like both Calvinist camps, confessional Lutherans view the work of salvation as monergistic in that "the natural [that is, corrupted and divinely unrenewed] powers of man cannot do anything or help towards salvation", and Lutherans go further along the same lines as the Free Grace advocates to say that the recipient of saving grace need not cooperate with it. Hence, Lutherans believe that a true Christian - in this instance, a genuine recipient of saving grace - can lose his or her salvation, "[b]ut the cause is not as though God were unwilling to grant grace for perseverance to those in whom He has begun the good work… [but that these persons] wilfully turn away…"

Free Grace view 
Free grace advocates criticize persevarance of the saints, because they claim that persevarance puts assurance in good works. Free grace advocates believe that believers are promised eternal security, but that God does not promise persevarance.

Comparison among Protestants
This table summarizes the views of three different Protestant beliefs.

Notes

References

Traditional Calvinist view

 A. W. Pink (2001). Eternal Security. Sovereign Grace Publishers. 
 Anthony A. Hoekema (1994) Saved by Grace. Wm. B. Eerdmans. 
 D. Martyn Lloyd-Jones (1976). Romans 8:17-39: The Final Perseverance of the Saints. Banner of Truth. 
 G. C. Berkouwer (1958). Studies in Dogmatics: Faith and Perseverance. Wm. B. Eerdmans Publishing Company. 
 Thomas R. Schreiner & Ardel B. Caneday (2001). The Race Set Before Us: A Biblical Theology of Perseverance and Assurance. Inter-Varsity Press. 
 Judith M. Gundry (1991). Paul and Perseverance: Staying in and Falling Away. Westminster/John Knox. 
 Alan P. Stanley (2007). Salvation is More Complicated Than You Think: A Study on the Teachings of Jesus. Authentic Publishing.

Free Grace view

 Charles C. Ryrie (1989, 1997). So Great Salvation: What it Means to Believe in Jesus Christ. Moody Publishers. 
 Charles Stanley (1990). Eternal Security: Can You Be Sure?. Oliver-Nelson Books. 
 Charles C. Bing (1991). Lordship Salvation: A Biblical Evaluation and Response. GraceLife. 
 Joseph C. Dillow (1992). The Reign of the Servant Kings: A Study of Eternal Security and the Final Significance of Man. Schoettle Publishing Company. 
 Michael Eaton (1995). No Condemnation: A New Theology of Assurance. InterVarsity Press. 
 Chuck Smith (1996). Living Water: The Power of the Holy Spirit In Your Life. Harvest House Publishers. 
 Norman L. Geisler (1999, 2001). Chosen But Free: A Balanced View of Divine Election, 2nd ed. Bethany House Publishers. 
 Robert N. Wilkin (2005). Secure and Sure: Grasping the Promises of God. Grace Evangelical Society. 
 Lou Martuneac (2006). In Defense of the Gospel. Xulon Press. 
 Phillip M. Evans (2008). Eternal Security Proved!. Lulu Enterprises, Inc.

Arminian view

 W. T. Purkiser (1956, 1974 2nd ed.). Security: The False and the True. Beacon Hill Press. 
 Robert Shank (1960). Life in the Son: A Study of the Doctrine of Perseverance. Bethany House Publishers. 
 I. Howard Marshall (1969, 1995 Rev. ed.). Kept by the Power of God: A Study of Perseverance and Falling Away. Paternoster Press. 
 David Pawson (1996). Once Saved, Always Saved? A Study in Perseverance and Inheritance. Hodder & Stoughton. 
 Robert E. Picirilli (2002). Grace, Faith, Free Will. Contrasting Views of Salvation: Calvinism and Arminianism. Randall House Publications. 
 Frederick W. Claybrook, Jr. (2003) Once Saved, Always Saved? A New Testament Study of Apostasy. University Press of America. 
 French L. Arrington (2005). Unconditional Eternal Security: Myth or Truth? Pathway Press.

New Perspective view

 Don Garlington (1994, 2009). Faith, Obedience, and Perseverance: Aspects of Paul’s Letter to the Romans. Wipf & Stock Publishers. 
 B. J. Oropeza (2000, 2007). Paul and Apostasy: Eschatology, Perseverance, and Falling Away in the Corinthian Congregation. Wipf & Stock Publishers. 
 B. J. Oropeza (2011). In the Footsteps of Judas and Other Defectors: Apostasy in the New Testament Communities, Volume 1: The Gospels, Acts, and Johannine Letters. Wipf & Stock Publishers. 
 B. J. Oropeza (2012). Jews, Gentiles, and the Opponents of Paul: Apostasy in the New Testament Communities, Volume 2: The Pauline Letters. Wipf & Stock Publishers. 
 B. J. Oropeza (2012). Churches under Siege of Persecution and Assimilation: Apostasy in the New Testament Communities, Volume 3: The General Epistles and Revelation. Wipf & Stock Publishers. 
 Scot McKnight (2013). A Long Faithfulness: The Case for Christian Perseverance, Patheos Press. .

Confessional Lutheran view

 Theodore G. Tappert(editor). The Book of Concord.

Catholic view

 Final Perseverance - Catholic Encyclopedia
 Karlo Broussard (2020) Salvation Requires Perseverance in Faith Catholic Answers

Multiple views

 Herbert W. Bateman IV, ed. (2007). Four Views on the Warning Passages in Hebrews. Kregel Publications. 
 J. Matthew Pinson, ed. (2002). Four Views on Eternal Security. Zondervan. 

Calvinist theology
Salvation in Protestantism
Five Points of Calvinism
Apostasy